John Woods (October 18, 1794 – July 30, 1855) was a U.S. Representative from Ohio.

Born in Johnstown, Pennsylvania, Woods moved with his parents to Ohio, where he attended the common schools.  As a young man, he served in the War of 1812.  After the war he operated a school near Springborough for two years.  He studied law, was admitted to the bar in 1819 and commenced the practice of his profession in Hamilton, Ohio.
From 1820 to 1825, he served as prosecuting attorney of Butler County.

Woods was elected to the Nineteenth and Twentieth Congresses (March 4, 1825 – March 3, 1829).  He was an unsuccessful candidate for re-election in 1828 to the Twenty-first Congress.  In 1829 he became editor and publisher of the Hamilton Intelligencer.  He served as state auditor of Ohio from 1845 to 1852 as a Whig. Woods was also president of the Cincinnati, Hamilton and Indianapolis Railroad.

He died in Hamilton, Ohio on July 30, 1855.  He was interred in Greenwood Cemetery.

Sources 

1794 births
1855 deaths
State Auditors of Ohio
Ohio lawyers
American prosecutors
Politicians from Johnstown, Pennsylvania
Politicians from Hamilton, Ohio
19th-century American newspaper editors
19th-century American railroad executives
American military personnel of the War of 1812
Ohio Whigs
19th-century American politicians
County district attorneys in Ohio
National Republican Party members of the United States House of Representatives from Ohio
Burials at Greenwood Cemetery (Hamilton, Ohio)